The 1903 Home Nations Championship was the twenty-first series of the rugby union Home Nations Championship. Six matches were played between 10 January and 21 March. It was contested by England, Ireland, Scotland and Wales.

Table

Results

The matches

Wales vs. England

Wales: John Strand-Jones (Llanelli), Fred Jowett (Swansea), Dan Rees (Swansea), Rhys Gabe (Llanelli), Tom Pearson (Newport) capt., Dicky Owen (Swansea), Llewellyn Lloyd (Newport), Jehoida Hodges (Newport), Will Joseph (Swansea), Will Osborne (Mountain Ash), Arthur Harding (Cardiff), Alfred Brice (Aberavon), David Jones (Treherbert), George Boots (Newport), George Travers (Pill Harriers)

England: HT Gamlin (Blackheath), JH Miles (Leicester), RH Spooner (Liverpool), JT Taylor (West Hartlepool), T Simpson (Rockcliff), B Oughtred (Hartlepool Rovers) capt., Frank Croft Hulme (Birkenhead Park), G Fraser (Richmond), Vincent Cartwright (Oxford Uni.), R Bradley (West Hartlepool), J Duthie (West Hartlepool), RFA Hobbs (Blackheath), Denys Dobson (Oxford Uni.), PF Hardwick (Percy Park), RD Wood (Liverpool OB)

Scotland vs. Wales

Scotland: WT Forrest (Hawick), HJ Orr (London Scottish), AN Fell (Edinburgh University), Alec Boswell Timms (Edinburgh University), JE Crabbie (Oxford Uni.), J Knox (Kelvinside Acads), ED Simson (Edinburgh University), L West (Edinburgh University), AG Cairns (Watsonians), WE Kyle (Hawick), David Bedell-Sivright (Cambridge Uni), Mark Coxon Morrison  (Royal HSFP) capt., WP Scott (West of Scotland), James Greenlees (Kelvinside Acads.), N Kennedy (West of Scotland)

Wales: John Strand-Jones (Llanelli), William Richard Arnold (Swansea), Dan Rees (Swansea), Rhys Gabe (Llanelli), Billy Trew (Swansea), Dicky Owen (Swansea), Llewellyn Lloyd (Newport) capt., Jehoida Hodges (Newport), Will Joseph (Swansea), Will Osborne (Mountain Ash), Arthur Harding (Cardiff), Alfred Brice (Aberavon), David Jones (Treherbert), George Boots (Newport), George Travers (Pill Harriers)

Ireland vs. England

Ireland: J Fulton (NIFC), HJ Anderson (Old Wesley), DR Taylor (Queen's Uni, Belfast), GAD Harvey (Wanderers), CC Fitzgerald (Dungannon), Louis Magee (Bective Rangers), Harry Corley (Dublin University) capt., Thomas Arnold Harvey (Dublin University), GT Hamlet (Old Wesley), M Ryan (Rockwell College), A Tedford (Malone), P Healey (Limerick), JJ Coffey (Lansdowne), F Gardiner (NIFC), RS Smyth (Dublin University)

England: HT Gamlin (Blackheath), R Forrest (Blackheath), AT Brettargh (Liverpool OB), JT Taylor (West Hartlepool), T Simpson (Rockcliff), B Oughtred (Hartlepool Rovers) capt., FC Hulme (Birkenhead Park), G Fraser (Richmond), Vincent Cartwright (Oxford Uni.), BA Hill (Blackheath), SG Williams (Devonport Albion), WG Heppell (Devonport Albion), Denys Dobson (Oxford Uni.), PF Hardwick (Percy Park), RD Wood (Liverpool OB)

Scotland vs. Ireland

Scotland: WT Forrest (Hawick), HJ Orr (London Scottish), C France (Kelvinside Acads), AS Drybrough (Edinburgh Wanderers), JE Crabbie (Oxford Uni.), J Knox (Kelvinside Acads), ED Simson (Edinburgh University), L West (Edinburgh University), AG Cairns (Watsonians), WE Kyle (Hawick), David Bedell-Sivright (Cambridge Uni), Mark Coxon Morrison  (Royal HSFP) capt., WP Scott (West of Scotland), James Greenlees (Kelvinside Acads.), N Kennedy (West of Scotland)

Ireland: J Fulton (NIFC), HJ Anderson (Old Wesley), JB Allison (Edinburgh University), GAD Harvey (Wanderers), CC Fitzgerald (Dungannon), Louis Magee (Bective Rangers), Harry Corley (Dublin University) capt., Jos Wallace (Wanderers), GT Hamlet (Old Wesley), CE Allen (Derry), A Tedford (Malone), P Healey (Limerick), JJ Coffey (Lansdowne), Samuel Irwin (NIFC), RS Smyth (Dublin University)

Wales vs. Ireland

Wales: Bert Winfield (Cardiff), Willie Llewellyn (London Welsh), Gwyn Nicholls (Cardiff) capt., Rhys Gabe (Llanelli), Teddy Morgan (London Welsh), Dicky Owen (Swansea), Llewellyn Lloyd (Newport), Jehoida Hodges (Newport), Will Joseph (Swansea), Will Osborne (Mountain Ash), Arthur Harding (Cardiff), Alfred Brice (Aberavon), David Jones (Treherbert), George Boots (Newport), George Travers (Pill Harriers)

Ireland: J Fulton (NIFC), G Bradshaw (Belfast Collegians), James Cecil Parke (Dublin University), C Reid (NIFC), Gerry Doran (Lansdowne), Louis Magee (Bective Rangers), Harry Corley (Dublin University) capt., Jos Wallace (Wanderers), GT Hamlet (Old Wesley), CE Allen (Derry), A Tedford (Malone), P Healey (Limerick), JJ Coffey (Lansdowne), F Gardiner (NIFC), TA Harvey (Monkstown)

England vs. Scotland

England: HT Gamlin(Blackheath), T Simpson (Rockcliff), AT Brettargh (Liverpool OB), EIM Barrett (Lennox), R Forrest (Blackheath) WV Butcher (Streatham & Croydon), PD Kendall (Birkenhead Park) capt., NC Fletcher (OMT), Vincent Cartwright (Oxford Uni.), BA Hill (Blackheath), SG Williams (Devonport Albion), Frank Stout (Richmond), Denys Dobson (Oxford Uni.), PF Hardwick (Percy Park), R Pierce (Liverpool)

Scotland: WT Forrest (Hawick), HJ Orr (London Scottish), AN Fell (Edinburgh University), Alec Boswell Timms (Edinburgh University), JS MacDonald (Edinburgh University), J Knox (Kelvinside Acads), ED Simson (Edinburgh University), L West (Edinburgh University), AG Cairns (Watsonians), WE Kyle (Hawick), J Ross (London Scottish), John Dallas (Watsonians), WP Scott (West of Scotland), James Greenlees (Kelvinside Acads.) capt., N Kennedy (West of Scotland)

Bibliography

External links

1902–03
1902–03 in British rugby union
1902–03 in English rugby union
rugby union
rugby union
Home Nations Championship
Home Nations Championship
Home Nations Championship
1902–03 in Scottish rugby union